Karkush (also Romanized as Karkūsh; also known as Garkosh and Kar kosh) is a village in Aland Rural District, Safayyeh District, Khoy County, West Azerbaijan Province, Iran. At the 2006 census, its population was 594, in 113 families.

References 

Populated places in Khoy County